Willow Creek is a  long tributary of the Columbia River, located in the U.S. state of Oregon. It drains  of Morrow and Gilliam counties. Arising in the Blue Mountains, it flows generally northwest to its confluence with the Columbia River upstream of Arlington.

Course
Willow Creek's headwaters are located near Arbuckle Mountain in the Blue Mountains, southeast of Heppner. It flows north, then west, receiving the North Fork on the right and Skinners Fork on the left. Willow Creek flows northwest through Heppner, receiving Hinton Creek on the right. About  later, the creek travels through Lexington. Soon after, Rhea Creek enters on the left, and Willow Creek passes through the communities of Ione and Morgan. Turning north, it crosses into Gilliam County, flowing beneath Highway 74 and Interstate 84/Highway 30 just before its mouth.

Discharge

Watershed
Willow Creek drains  of the Columbia Plateau region of Oregon. Ninety percent is privately owned, nine percent is owned by U.S. federal agencies such as the United States Forest Service, Bureau of Land Management, and United States Department of Defense, and one percent is owned by the state of Oregon. About 60 percent of the watershed is either forested, rangeland, or shrubland, 39 percent is cropland, and 1 percent is urban.

Fish

No anadromous fish are known to inhabit streams in the Willow Creek watershed. Small and largemouth bass, black crappie, brown bullhead, bluegill, and pumpkinseed live in Willow Creek Lake.

History

Strong thunderstorms moved over the Heppner area on June 14, 1903, causing heavy rain and hail. Within fifteen minutes, a  wall of water swept down Willow Creek. The flash flood washed away one-third of the town's structures, killing 247 people in the "most deadly natural disaster in Oregon's recorded history." In 1983, the Willow Creek Dam was constructed just upstream of Heppner. The resulting Willow Creek Lake's primary use is flood control.

See also
List of rivers of Oregon
List of longest streams of Oregon

Notes

References

Rivers of Oregon
Rivers of Gilliam County, Oregon
Rivers of Morrow County, Oregon
Heppner, Oregon